Club de Fútbol Virgen de Lluc (popularly Verge de Lluc) is a football club from Palma (Balearic Islands, Spain), founded in 1969.

The club was one of most representative entities in the neighborhood, of a humble and popular nature. It was created at Mare de Déu de Lluc neighborhood, built in 1957 on the outskirts of Palma as a group of social housing, basically populated by peninsular immigrant population.

History 
Initially there was a children's team (1958-59 season) and a youth team (1961-62 season), but it was not until 1969 that the club achieved stability. Then it began to compete his first men's team and, since 1970, the youth and women's teams. Her best years came in the early 1970s, with the women's team, and in the early 1990s, when the men's team reached Regional Preferente.

In the mid-1990s the club's activity began to decline due to the poor condition of its playing field. From 1997 first team stopped competing and in 2002 the club was sportingly inactive due to lack of adequate playing field.

Between 2014 and 2016 an attempt was made to regain the club's activity with grassroots football teams, but the initiative was unsuccessful. Despite everything the club has not disappeared as a sports society and continues to maintain a basic structure.

Season to season 

2 seasons in Reg. Pref.
15 seasons in 1ª Reg.
10 seasons in 2ª Reg.
1 seasons in 3ª Reg.

Honours 

 Segunda Regional
 Winners (1): 1981-82
 Runners-up (1): 1974-75
 Tercera Regional
 Runners-up (1): 1972-73
 Mallorca Women Championship
 Winners (1): 1971

Women's team 
The club has a women's section, becoming one of most veteran clubs in competition in Balearic Islands.

The club achieved great importance in the early 1970s thanks to women's team, one of the first ones organized in Mallorca and the one with the greatest sporting potential in those years when the competition was organized for the first time in Balearic Islands, despite which was not consolidated.

The team won the Championship of Mallorca organized in the 1970–71 season, against CE Constància, and remained the most representative team until the disappearance of women's football in Balearic Islands, around 1973.

Stadium 
The club's playing field, formerly known as Campo de Fútbol José Sempere, is located in the same neighborhood of Mare de Déu de Lluc. It was privately owned until 2002, when Palma City Council acquired it for reforming the field; which was very dilapidated and had already ceased to function due to its poor condition.

Some maintenance work was undertaken in 2015 and reform was planned, but nothing was done.

In May 2018, the first phase of reform was executed with the demolition of outer wall, bleachers and construction of a new wall. However, the second phase was stopped indefinitely and the refurbishment of the facility could not be completed.

References

External links 
 

Football clubs in the Balearic Islands
Association football clubs established in 1969
Sport in Palma de Mallorca
1969 establishments in Spain